Hungerford Marsh Lock is a lock on the Kennet and Avon Canal, at Hungerford, Berkshire, England.

The lock has a rise/fall of 8 ft 1 in (2.46 m).

The lock is unique compared to others on the canal in that it has a swing bridge directly over the centre of the lock that must be opened before the lock may be used.

References

See also

Locks on the Kennet and Avon Canal

Locks of Berkshire
Locks on the Kennet and Avon Canal
Hungerford